Rajya Sabha elections were held on various dates in 2009, to elect members of the Rajya Sabha, Indian Parliament's upper chamber. The elections were held  to elect respectively four members from Jammu and Kashmir, three members from Kerala and one member from Pondicherry for the Council of States, the Rajya Sabha.

Elections
Elections were held to elect members from states of J&K, KL, PY.

Members elected
The following members are elected in the elections held in 2009. They are members for the term 2009-2015 and retire in year 2015, except in case of the resignation or death before the term. The list is incomplete.

Member - Party - State

Members retired 

State - Member - Party

 JK - S. Tarlok Singh - JKPDP
 JK - Saifuddin Soz  - INC
 JK - Farooq Abdullah - JKNC
 JK - Aslam Chowdhary Mohammad - JKPDP (members from J&K retired in Nov 2008 )

 KL - K. Chandran Pillai - CPM
 KL - Thennala Balakrishna Pillai - INC
 KL - Vayalar Ravi - INC

 PY - V. Narayanasamy - INC

Bye-elections
The bye-elections were also held for the vacant seats from the State of Andhra Pradesh, Jharkhand and Uttar Pradesh, and Bihar.

 Bye-elections were held on 23 March 2009 for vacancy from Andhra Pradesh due to resignation  of seating member C. Ramachandraiahon 22/01/2009 with term ending on 21/06/2010.N. Janardhana Reddy of INC became member since 01/04/2009.

 Bye-elections were held on 20 June 2009 for vacancy from Jharkhand and Uttar Pradesh  due to resignations of seating member Digvijay Singh on 05/04/2009 with term ending on 07/07/2010 and seating member Banwari Lal Kanchhal on 23/04/2009 with term ending on 02/04/2012. From JH Dhiraj Prasad Sahu of INC and from UP Ganga Charan Rajput of BSP became the members.

 Bye-elections were held on 20 June 2009 for vacancy from Jharkhand and Uttar Pradesh  due to elections of Lok Sabha of seating member Yashwant Sinha  on 16/05/2009 with term ending on 07/07/2010 and seating member Murli Manohar Joshi on 23/04/2009 with term ending on 04/07/2010. From JH Hemant Soren of JMM and from UP Shriram Pal of BSP became the members.

 Bye-elections were held on 4 August 2009 for vacancy from Bihar due to elections of Lok Sabha of seating member Sharad Yadav of JDS on 13/05/2009 with term ending on 07/07/2010. From BH  George Fernandes of JDS became the member.

 Bye-elections were held on 8 January 2010 for vacancy from Bihar due to death of seating member Mahendra Sahni  of JDU on 06/11/2009 with term ending on 02/04/2012. Dr Anil Kumar Sahani of JDU became the member.

References

2009 elections in India
2009